American country music singer Jerrod Niemann has released seven studio albums and fourteen singles. After independently releasing Long Hard Road and Jukebox of Hard Knocks independently, he signed with Category 5 Records and then with Arista Nashville. His most commercially successful release through Arista Nashville was Judge Jerrod & the Hung Jury, which reached number one on Top Country Albums and produced the single "Lover, Lover", a number one single on Hot Country Songs. Niemann also reached number one on the chart with "Drink to That All Night".

Studio albums

Singles

Other singles

Christmas songs

Music videos

Notes

References

Country music discographies
Discographies of American artists